The Federal Inland Revenue Service (FIRS) is the agency responsible for assessing, collecting and accounting for tax and other revenues accruing to the Federal Government of Nigeria.

History 
Federal Inland Revenue Service (FIRS) was created in 1943. Prior to that time, its functions had been performed by the Inland Revenue Department of British West Africa. The Board of Inland Revenue was created in 1958, and the service gained autonomy with the passing of the FIRS (Establishment) Act 13 of 2007.

In 2003, the Federal Government of Nigeria recognized that poor service delivery in the public sector had become an urgent national issue and undertook a series of steps that lead to the entering into a Service Compact (SERVICOM) with all Nigerians in March 2004. This was followed by the creation of the SERVICOM office within the Presidency to ensure the entrenchment of excellent service delivery in the public sector in policy, programmes and practice.
In line with the subsequent Presidential Mandate, the FIRS created a unit in 2014 to institutionalize Service Delivery within the Service. This unit has undergone various transformations to meet the tempo of ever-changing FIRS organizational reforms and the needs of taxpaying public and stakeholders. In 2011 FIRS created a Taxpayer Service Department (TPSD) for enhanced focus on taxpayers as well as National Taxpayer Advocate position (in 2012) to ensure effective high-level advocacy for taxpayers.

Leadership 
Organisational structure/Board

According to the FIRS ACT, the organisational structure of FIRS consists of:

Executive Chairman
Nine members with relevant qualifications and expertise appointed by the President to represent each of the 9 geo-political zones
A representative of the Attorney-General of the Federation
The Governor of the Central Bank of Nigeria or his representative
A representative of the Minister of Finance not below the rank of a Director
The Chairman of the Revenue Mobilization, Allocation and Fiscal Commission
The Group Managing Director of the Nigerian National Petroleum Corporation
The Comptroller-General of the Nigeria Customs Service or his representative not below the rank of Deputy Comptroller-General;
The Registrar-General of the Corporate Affairs Commission or his representative
The Chief Executive Officer of the National Planning Commission or his representative

President Muhammadu Buhari appointed Muhammad Mamman Nami as the new Executive Chairman of FIRS. He replaces Babatunde Fowler.

Mandate and operations

Statutorily and administratively, the FIRS has the responsibility for the assessment, collection and accounting of taxes to the  Government:
 The timely provision and publication of accurate data and annual reports to the Federal Government of Nigeria and other stakeholders to inform national economic planning, academic research, tax policy and development legislation 
 The timely provision of tax advisory services, rulings, guidance notes and clarifications on request and to the public in general
 The regular investigation, enforcement and prosecution of tax defaulters as provided by the law 
 The issuance of “Taxpayer Identification Number” (TIN) at no cost to the taxpayer
 The prompt processing of payment claims and tax refund requests received, within stated timeframes
 Undertake appropriate actions to reduce the arrears position of the service and minimize debt profile
 The regular and accurate reconciliation of taxes received into Federation, Consolidated and VAT the case may be 
 Provision of tax education & information to taxpayers through diverse channels and languages

External links
FIRS Alternative Portal
FIRS Career Portal

References

Revenue services